Megan Bülow (born December 25, 1999), known professionally as bülow (stylized in lowercase letters), is a German-Canadian pop singer who had success with her debut EP Damaged Vol. 1.

Early life 
Bülow was born in 1999 in Berlin, Germany. She grew up and lived in the United Kingdom, Canada, the United States, and the Netherlands. After being discovered at a summer camp in 2016, when she was 16, Bülow began collaborating with a number of Canadian writers and producers. Bülow currently resides in the Netherlands, where she recently completed high school at the American School of the Hague.

Damaged Vol. 1 
In November 2017, Bülow released her debut EP Damaged Vol. 1, garnering her the title of "New Artist of the Week" by Apple Music Canada. The EP featured three tracks, with the track "Not a Love Song" released as a single first. In a statement to Noisey, Bülow described her inspiration for the track as "the excitement of meeting someone for the first time" and eventually realizing that she "just wasn't ready for that commitment yet." The rest of her EP also consists of "smart, poignant tracks about guys".

Damaged Vol. 1 was praised by critics for its "real and authentic" portrayal of bülow's voice and use of dynamic percussion elements. "Not a Love Song" was also praised for its "bouncy" and "synth-saturated" style.

Tours 
On 9 April 2019, Bülow announced on Instagram that she would be touring with Lauv in the fall, visiting India and the American cities of Washington, D.C., Philadelphia, Boston, New York City, Chicago, Oakland, and Los Angeles. On 9 February 2020, Conan Gray announced that she would be supporting him on the European leg of his Kid Krow World Tour, starting on 26 April 2020. The tour was however postponed indefinitely due to the COVID-19 pandemic. On 29 October 2021, Conan Gray announced that Bülow would be joining him on the North America branch of his 2022 World Tour.

Awards and achievements

Juno Awards

Discography

Extended plays

Singles

As lead artist

As featured artist

References

External links 
The bülow Official Web Site
bülow - Not A Love Song (Official Video) at YouTube

Living people
Canadian pop singers
1999 births
21st-century Canadian women singers
Juno Award for Breakthrough Artist of the Year winners
German emigrants to Canada